Khadija Er-Rmichi (born 16 September 1989) is a Moroccan footballer who plays as a goalkeeper for AS FAR and the Morocco women's national team.

International career
Er-Rmichi capped for Morocco at senior level during the 2018 Africa Women Cup of Nations qualification (first round).

Honours 
AS FAR 
 Moroccan Women's Championship: 2013, 2014, 2016, 2017, 2018, 2019, 2020, 2021, 2022
 Moroccan Women Throne Cup: 2013, 2014, 2015, 2016, 2017, 2018, 2019, 2020
CAF Women's Champions League: 2022 third place: 2021
First place:2022
 UNAF-CAF Women's Champions League Qualifiers: 2021
 Morocco-United Arab Emirates Friendship Cup: 2016

See also
List of Morocco women's international footballers

References

1989 births
Living people
Moroccan women's footballers
Women's association football goalkeepers
Morocco women's international footballers